Roman Dzyuba (born June 8, 1979) is a paralympic athlete from Ukraine competing mainly in category T35 sprint events.

Roman won two silver medals at the 2000 Summer Paralympics in the T35 100m and 200m.

References

Paralympic athletes of Ukraine
Athletes (track and field) at the 2000 Summer Paralympics
Paralympic silver medalists for Ukraine
Living people
1979 births
Medalists at the 2000 Summer Paralympics
Paralympic medalists in athletics (track and field)
Ukrainian male sprinters